Simaethistis leechi is a moth in the family Simaethistidae. It was described by South in 1901. It is known from China.

References

Ditrysia
Moths described in 1901